Rumilly may refer to several communes in France:

 Rumilly, Haute-Savoie
 Rumilly, Pas-de-Calais
 Rumilly-en-Cambrésis, Nord
 Rumilly-lès-Vaudes, Aube